{{infobox company
| name = National Aviation Services Uganda
| logo = 
| industry = Aviation
| foundation = 
| location = Entebbe International Airport
| locations = 1
| key_people = Kenneth Bainomugisha Station ManagerNouamane ZahouaniGeneral Manager
| services = Ground Handling, Cargo Services Executive Aviation Travel ServicesAircraft MaintenanceCourier ServicesTrainingAirport Security
| revenue = 
| num_employees = 810 (2018)
| owner = 
| homepage = Homepage
}}National Aviation Services Uganda (NASU), also NAS Uganda, (formerly Entebbe Handling Services (ENHAS)', is an airport ground handling service company based in Uganda. It is the largest ground handling company at Entebbe International Airport , Uganda's largest civilian and military airport, where it services at least 19 airlines, as of November 2017.

Location
NAS Uganda maintains its headquarters at Entebbe International Airport, Entebbe, Uganda. The coordinates of the headquarters of NAS Uganda are 0°02'24.0"N, 32°27'10.0"E (Latitude:0.040000; Longitude:32.452778).

Overview
NAS Uganda is the largest ground services provider at Entebbe International Airport, Uganda's largest and busiest civilian and military airport, where it competes with DAS Handling Limited. At Entebbe, the company services a number of passenger and cargo airlines, including the US Government.

In 2006, ENHAS was awarded a contract to service United Nations flights at 10 airports in the Democratic Republic of the Congo and at 10 airports in South Sudan.

In April 2021, National Aviation Services International (NAS) in collaboration with Congo Handling Services (CHS), launched a new ground handling operation, called NAS Democratic Republic of the Congo'' (NAS DRC), with handling contracts at Kinshasa International Airport, Lubumbashi International Airport and Goma International Airport. At the beginning NAS DRC services (a) Ethiopian Airlines (b) Kenya Airways (c) DHL Aviation (d) Compagnie Africaine d'Aviation and (e) Uganda Airlines. The new company was awarded a ground handling license by the DR Congolese authorities in November 2020.

History
ENHAS was formed in 1996. The current Uganda's Minister of Foreign Affairs, Samuel Kutesa was an investor in the company. In June 2014, he was elected president of the United Nations General Assembly. In a press conference in New York City, he informed the press that he had suspended his interests in all the businesses that he owned, including his shareholding in ENHAS. In December 2018, the Daily Monitor newspaper reported that Kutesa had divested from ENHAS by selling his stake in the company to a group of investors from the United Arab Emirates.

Ownership
In 2017, ENHAS was acquired by Kuwaiti-based National Aviation Services (NAS). NAS is a large airport services provider, with operations in more than 30 airports across Africa, Asia and the Middle East. NAS also manages 31 airport lounges in 17 countries.

References

External links
 Profile of ENHAS Uganda At Centre For Aviation (CAPA)

Aircraft ground handling companies
Aviation companies of Uganda
Transport companies established in 1996
1996 establishments in Uganda